Slavena (pronounced slah-vyeh-nah) is a feminine given name of Slavic origin meaning 'Slavic Woman' or 'fame, glory'. The short form is Slávka and variants are Sláva, Slavinka, Slavenka, Vena. The masculine form is Slaven.

The name days are (Czech) 12 February and (Slovene) 31 December.

People with the name 
 Slávka Budínová, Czech actress

See also

 2821 Slávka, a minor planet named after Sláva Vávrová, the discoverer's mother 
 Slavic names

External links 
Slavěna -> Behind the Name

Slavic feminine given names
Czech feminine given names